Wolverine/Nick Fury: Scorpio Rising, sometimes just known as Scorpio Rising is a  graphic novel published by American company  Marvel Comics in 1994.

Publication history
The story was reprinted in Wolverine & Nick Fury: Scorpio in 2012, which contains the three stories of the trilogy, Wolverine/Nick Fury: The Scorpio Connection and Wolverine: Bloody Choices being the other two.

Plot
Fury's son, Mikel, is having a hard time training to become S.H.I.E.L.D. agent and soon he's seduced away by the cry of his homeland, Carpassia, which is undergoing revolution. He takes the Cosmic Key and heads for Carpassia, where HYDRA is using LMDs to wage war and to bait Mikel so Hydra steal the Key from him. Fury and Wolverine team up again to set Scorpio straight and free the country of HYDRA. It is later revealed that Mikel is the heir to the Carpassian throne from before the country was taken over by the Soviet Union. After Hydra is defeated, he runs for president and wins the election.

Collected editions
The trilogy was originally collected as in the following trade paperback.

The trilogy was also later reprinted in the Marvel Epic Collection of Wolverine.

Reception
The book was the third American highest selling trade-paperback of 1994.

SuperMegaMonkey of Comics Chronology stated that, despite being a sequel to The Scorpio Connection, it does not really delve into the Scorpio history any further; Howard Chaykin also drew the Scorpio Connection but did not get any writing credits for it and probably felt some ownership or connection with the characters. However, according to him, Scorpio Rising is just a general spy adventure story.

See also
 Nick's World
 1994 in comics

References

External links
 Wolverine & Nick Fury: Scorpio Rising at the Comic Book DB

1994 graphic novels
Marvel Comics graphic novels
Nick Fury titles
Wolverine (comics) titles